Adam Taub is a documentary film director from Greeley, Colorado whose films include La Quinceañera, Don Angelo, and El Duque de la Bachata. His film La Quinceañera won the 2007 award for Best Documentary at the Angelus Student Film Festival in Hollywood, California and Best Documentary at the San Diego Latino Film Festival. In 2009, he released a  film project entitled El Duque de la Bachata with Joan Soriano, a bachata and merengue musician from the Dominican Republic.

Film career
Don Angelo (2006) - The story of Angelo Chavez, a retired U.S. naval officer who spends his retirement years driving to Tijuana, Mexico to help those in need.

La Quinceañera (2007) - Exploring issues of family, faith, and coming of age, La Quinceañera is a portrait of a Mexican family's love and devotion to each other.

El Duque de la Bachata (2009) - This documentary follows Dominican bachata and merengue musician Joan Soriano as he works to accomplish his dream of a hit song and fame as an artist.

Articles and reviews
Criticas Review
Reeltalk Review
Greeley Tribune Article

References

 Angelus Award Winners
 iASO Records

External links

 La Quinceañera Official Website
 El Duque de la Bachata Official Website
 IMDB site for La Quinceañera

Year of birth missing (living people)
Living people
American documentary filmmakers
People from Greeley, Colorado